Reid Ryan (born November 21, 1971) is an American baseball executive, former college and professional baseball player, and son of Baseball Hall of Fame pitcher Nolan Ryan. He was a pitcher in minor league baseball, and currently serves as the CEO of Ryan-Sanders Baseball Inc., which owns the Round Rock Express and Corpus Christi Hooks. He was introduced as the president of the Houston Astros on May 17, 2013.

Early life
Ryan grew up in Alvin, Texas, outside of Houston, and attended Alvin High School.

College career
Ryan attended the University of Texas at Austin, beginning his college baseball career with the Texas Longhorns. He transferred to Texas Christian University and finished his collegiate career with the TCU Horned Frogs.

Professional career

Draft and minor leagues
The Texas Rangers, his father's team at the time, selected him in the 17th round (477th overall) of the 1994 Major League Baseball draft. He pitched for the Class A Short Season Hudson Valley Renegades in 1994, putting together a  5-5 record with a 2.89 earned run average (ERA) and 1.30 walks plus hits per inning pitched (WHIP) in 84 innings. He split 1995 between the Class A Charleston RiverDogs and Class A Advanced Visalia Oaks, combining for an 0-10 record with a 9.34 ERA and 2.29 WHIP.

Post-playing career
Along with his father, his brother, Reese, and former Houston Astros part-owner Don Sanders, Ryan is the CEO and president of Ryan-Sanders Baseball, Inc., a group that owns the Round Rock Express of the Class AAA Pacific Coast League and the Corpus Christi Hooks of the Class AA Texas League. He also serves on the board of trustees for Major League Baseball.

On May 16, 2013, the  Astros announced the hiring of Ryan as their president, following the resignation of George Postolos. The Astros won the 2017 World Series and won the 2019 American League pennant. Reid Ryan was demoted by the Astros after the 2019 World Series when Houston Astros sign stealing scandal came to light.  He returned as CEO of Ryan-Sanders in 2020.

Reid is the Executive Producer of the "Facing Nolan" documentary.

Personal life
Ryan and his wife, Nicole, have three children. Their son has cerebral palsy.

References

External links

Biography at the Round Rock Express Website

1971 births
Living people
Hudson Valley Renegades players
Charleston RiverDogs players
Visalia Oaks players
TCU Horned Frogs baseball players
Minor league baseball executives
People from Alvin, Texas
Major League Baseball team presidents
Houston Astros executives
American chief executives of professional sports organizations
Texas Longhorns baseball players
Anchorage Bucs players